John T. Godfrey is an American diplomat and foreign policy advisor who has served as the U.S. ambassador to Sudan since 2022, the first confirmed ambassador to the country since 1995.

Education 
Godfrey earned a Bachelor of Arts in political science from the University of California, Los Angeles and a Master of Arts in Middle East and North Africa studies from the University of Michigan.

Career 
Godfrey began his career as an assistant to the assistant secretary of state for near eastern affairs. He later served as political and economic chief in Ashgabat and as a political officer in Damascus. From 2007 to 2009, he served as a political and economic counselor at the U.S. embassy in Tripoli. In 2009 and 2010, he served as deputy political counselor for northern affairs at the Embassy of the United States, Baghdad. After serving as an arms control counselor at the United Nations Office at Vienna, he was chief of staff for Deputy Secretary of State William J. Burns. He later served in the U.S. embassy in Riyadh. Since January 2021, Godfrey has served as acting coordinator for counterterrorism.

Ambassador to Sudan

On January 26, 2022, President Joe Biden nominated Godfrey to be the ambassador to Sudan. Hearings on his nomination were held before the Senate Foreign Relations Committee on May 24, 2022. The committee favorably reported his nomination on June 9, 2022. On July 14, 2022, his nomination was confirmed by voice vote. He was sworn into office on August 23, 2022, and he presented his credentials to Sudanese head of state Abdel Fattah al-Burhan on September 1, 2022.

Godfrey is the first diplomat to serve in a permanent role there since Timothy M. Carney in 1996.

Personal life
Godfrey speaks Arabic.

References 

Year of birth missing (living people)
Living people
21st-century American diplomats
Ambassadors of the United States to Sudan
United States Foreign Service personnel
University of California, Los Angeles alumni
University of Michigan alumni